Ikonnikova House or House with the Mezzanine is an Art Nouveau-style building in Zheleznodorozhny City District of Novosibirsk, Russia. It is located on Chaplygin Street. The building was built in the early 1900s.

History
The place where the house is located belonged to the trading house of E. G. Ikonnikova.

In the 1980s, the house was occupied by the Terpsichora Dance Society.

See also
 Kryukov House
 Zedain House
 Zhernakova House

References

External links
  Памятники истории, архитектуры и монументального искусства Новосибирской области.

Zheleznodorozhny City District, Novosibirsk
Buildings and structures in Novosibirsk
Art Nouveau architecture in Russia
Cultural heritage monuments of regional significance in Novosibirsk Oblast